Legislative Assembly election was held in Gujarat from 1 to 5 December 2022 in two phases, to elect 182 members of 15th Gujarat Legislative Assembly. The votes were counted and the results were declared on 8 December 2022.

The Bharatiya Janata Party won a super majority of 156 seats, the most ever won by any party in Gujarat's history. The Indian National Congress fell to its lowest count in the state for 3 decades, and the Aam Aadmi Party gained five seats.

Background
The tenure of 14th Gujarat Legislative Assembly is scheduled to end on 18 February 2023. The previous assembly elections were held in December 2017. After the election, Bharatiya Janata Party (BJP) formed the state government, with Vijay Rupani becoming Chief Minister.

Vijay Rupani resigned from Chief Minister post on 11 September 2021 and he was succeeded by Bhupendra Patel as the new Chief Minister.

Since the last assembly elections, several bypolls were held, most of which were won by the BJP, taking their strength from 99 to 112 seats.

Local body elections 

BJP swept the 2021 Gujarat local body elections by winning all corporation and district panchayats and Indian National Congress (Congress) gained majority in one municipality and 18 taluka panchayats. On one side BJP increased its strength and on the other side Aam Aadmi Party (AAP) made significant inroads to be considered as a contender in the state.

In 2017 Gujarat Legislative Assembly election, BJP was lost in some districts of Saurashtra due to farmer and Patidar agitation; notably in Amreli and Gir Somnath where it lost all seats to Congress. However, when panchayat elections were held in Amreli along with other districts, BJP gained a two thirds majority translating to a lead on all five assembly segments of Amreli, while AAP gaining in rural Gujarat indicated that Gujarat is heading towards a three cornered contest.

In the Gandhinagar Municipal Corporation elections, BJP got majority by winning 41 out of 44 wards while Congress got two seats. AAP won one seat and was the third largest party in terms of vote share, which indicated increasing acceptance of AAP as a third alternative. Congress dubbed the AAP as a 'B team' of the BJP for by dividing the anti-BJP votes, which ultimately favoured the BJP.

Schedule
The election schedule was announced by the Election Commission of India on 3 November 2022.

Election statistics 
Source:

Parties and alliances



Congress and NCP announced an alliance to contest the election together on 11 November 2022.

In May 2022, AAP announced alliance with Bharatiya Tribal Party for the election. However, the alliance was called off in September 2022.

Others

Candidates
AAP released the first list of 10 candidates on 2 August 2022, the second list of 9 candidates on 18 August, the third list of 10 candidates on 7 September, the fourth list of 12 candidates on 6 October, the fifth list of 12 candidates on 16 October 2022, the sixth list of 20 candidates on 20 October 2022, the seventh list of 13 candidates on 28 October 2022, the eight list of 22 candidates on 1 November 2022, the ninth list of 10 candidates on 3 November 2022, the tenth list of 21 candidates on 5 November 2022, the eleventh list of 12 candidates on 7 November 2022, the twelfth list of 7 candidates on 8 November 2022, the thirteenth list of 12 candidates on 9 November 2022, the fourteenth list of 10 candidates on 10 November 2022 and the fifteenth list of 3 candidates on 12 November 2022. On 13 November 2022, AAP released the sixteenth list of 2 candidates including their Chief Ministerial candidate, Isudan Gadhvi contesting from Khambhalia constituency. AAP released the seventeenth list of 4 candidates on 15 November 2022. AAP candidate from Surat East withdrew his nomination on 16 November. AAP candidate from Abdasa retired his campaign in favour of BJP candidate on 28 November 2022.

Congress released the first list of 43 candidates on 4 November 2022, the second list of 46 candidates on 10 November 2022, the third list of 7 candidates on 11 November 2022, the fourth list of 9 candidates on 12 November 2022, the fifth list of 6 candidates and the sixth list of 33 candidates on 13 November 2022 and the seventh list of 37 candidates on 16 November 2022. NCP announced 3 candidates in alliance with Congress. NCP candidate from Devgadhbariya withdrew his nomination on 21 November 2022.

BJP released the first list of 160 candidates on 10 November 2022 and the second list of 6 candidates on 12 November 2022. BJP candidate from Wadhwan refused to contest election and was replaced in the third list on 13 November 2022. BJP released the fourth list of 12 candidates on 14 November 2022, the fifth list of 3 candidates on 16 November 2022 and the sixth list of 1 candidate on 17 November 2022.

Issues

Alcohol 
Following the death of 50 people in 2022 Gujarat toxic liquor deaths, alcohol and drug consumption became an issue in the election. Congress demanded a probe by the sitting high court judge in the illegal liquor trade in Gujarat. Former Congress president Rahul Gandhi publicly asked which "ruling forces" are "giving protection to these mafia". AAP state president Gopal Italia had demanded an investigation by Central Bureau of Investigation (CBI) in the incident.

Drugs 
In September 2021, 2,988.22 kilograms (6,587.9 lb) of heroin was seized from two containers which arrived at Mundra Port, from Bandar Abbas in Iran. Heroin was disguised as a consignment of semi-processed talc stones originating from Afghanistan. The incident occurred again in May and July 2022, where 52 kg and 75 kg of drugs were seized from the port respectively. Notably, the Mundra Port was owned by Narendra Modi's ally Gautam Adani, founder of the Adani Group.

The Congress criticized the BJP-led government over their silence right after the September 2021 drug bust and urged the Supreme Court to open a probe, alleging that a drug syndicate was operating from the port. It was also concerned that the drugs were sourced from Afghanistan, saying the illegal sale of these drugs might be used against India by terrorists. In May, when drugs were again seized at the Mundra Port, Congress again criticized the government asking why drugs were repeatedly found in the coastline of Gujarat.

AAP also registered their protest on the issue of drug seizure.

Gujarat ATS after seized 350 kg heroin drugs said that since Gujarat being on coast has become a preferred route for drug smuggling, the State and federal agencies have seized drug cargos upon landing.

Corruption 
The written examination for recruitment of head clerks was held on 12 December 2021 in which with 88,000 aspirants had appeared for 186 vacancies. The exam was conducted by Gujarat Subordinate Service Selection Board (GSSSB). INC alleged that Asit Vora, a BJP leader served as the chairman of GSSSB is mastermind behind this. A total of 36 people from Gandhinagar, Ahmedabad, Sabarkantha were arrested in the case, including alleged mastermind Tushar Mer.

AAP had alleged that before the examination, the question paper was leaked and sold at cost of Rs 8-12 lakh. Later on Gujarat government annulled the exam and announced re-examination scheduled for March 2022. 500 supporters of AAP staged a protest outside BJP, Gandhinagar Office demanding the removal of BJP leader Asit Vora from the post of chairman of the GSSSB. BJP workers clashed with AAP protestors and the police resorted to lathicharge. BJP leader filed police case against AAP. Ninety-three AAP members were arrested including 28 women. AAP president Italia, AAP women's wing and youth wing presidents were among those arrested. Italia and other AAP leaders spent 10 days in prison before getting bail.

AAP highlighted the rampant corruption leading to paper leaks for the examinations conducted by the state government being reported since 2015. Delhi Chief Minister Arvind Kejriwal compared it with the Vyapam scam in Madhya Pradesh and called recruitment exams in Gujarat as Maha Vyapam Scam (great Vyapam Scam). AAP promised to create laws that would punish the paper leaking offence with ten years of punishment.

Congress slammed the government over the paper leaks for the recruitment examinations. They also held a mock assembly in Gandhinagar, highlighting the plight of thousands of job-seekers who had taken the now-cancelled head clerk recruitment exam. All Congress MLAs and party leaders took part in the mock assembly. Leader of the Opposition and senior Congress leader Sukhram Rathwa urged the Gujarat government to conduct a judicial inquiry through a sitting HC judge on the series of exam paper leaks, saying it amounts to cheating the youth of Gujarat. He also alleged that the RSS and the BJP were behind the paper leaks. and Congress MLAs protested against the paper leaks in the assembly, standing from their seats and displaying posters in connection with the leak, causing the assembly to be adjourned for 15 minutes. The Congress also staged a protest at Koba, Gandhinagar demanding Asit Vora to resign.

Agriculture 
In March, thousands of farmers across Gujarat are protesting at their taluka and district headquarters demanding adequate power supply to save standing crops.

Unemployment 
As per a survey conducted by ABP News, unemployment is the biggest issue for people in Gujarat. Unemployment has been steadily increasing in the state. As per the quarterly bulletin of the Periodic Labour Force Survey (PLFS), Gujarat had among the lowest rates of unemployment in urban areas. As per Periodic Labour Force Survey (PLFS) estimates - April–June 2022 bulletin, unemployment rate in Gujarat was 3.3%, lesser than the national average.

There were four lakh unemployed people registered with state's Employment Exchange Department in March 2021, out of which 3,85,506 were literate and just five percent were semi-skilled. According to state budget figures released in March 2022, there are 3,46,436 educated and 17,816 semi-literate unemployed youth in Gujarat that have been registered with various employment exchanges and the government of Gujarat was able to give jobs to only 0.35% of unemployed youth over the last 2 years.

Education 

About 700 government schools in Gujarat function with only one teacher each. As many as 8,500 other primary schools have only two teachers each. According to a top study by the  Annual Status of Education Report 2014, only 9.8% of the children in rural Gujarat studying in class V could read English sentences, compared to the all-India average of 24%. It was the second lowest amount of class V students able to read English compared to the rural areas of all the other states.

According to government statistics, Gujarat had a high annual dropout rate of 24% in secondary classes (grade 9-10) compared to other states.

Price Rise 

In April, the Congress held protests in several cities throughout Gujarat against rising fuel prices and inflation. In Amraiwadi, Congress workers brought empty LPG cylinders brought a hard paper cutout of a fuel dispenser during their protest against fuel and cooking gas prices. They also held protests in several other cities where they burnt effigies, sat on dharna protest and even clashed with the police. Around a dozen Congress workers were then detained by the police for burning effigy and protesting without permission. On 16 May, Congress workers again held a protest against price rise in Rajkot, led by Rajkot city president Arjun Khatariya. This led to 30 Congress workers being detained by the police, including Khatariya.

Campaigns

Aam Aadmi Party 
Aam Aadmi Party, Gujarat started its election campaign for Gujarat on 2 April with a Padayatra. In May 2022, AAP declared its alliance with Bharatiya Tribal Party for the assembly elections. However, the alliance was called off in September 2022.

On 2 August 2022, Kejriwal addressed a public rally in Veraval, Saurashtra and announced "guarantees." AAP has announced Rozgaar Guarantee Yatra in three districts of North Gujarat namely Patan, Sabarkantha and Banaskantha. The campaign would appeal to the unemployed youth. On 2 September Kejriwal announced five guarantees for farmers in Devbhumi Dwarka district.

In the months leading to the election, several protests were held in the state where AAP supported the protestors.

Isudan Gadhvi was announced as the Chief Minister candidate on 4 November 2022.

Manifesto

 
 Education: free education in government schools. A school will be started in each of the 18,000 village panchayats.
 Healthcare: free and quality health-care facilities for all. Mohalla clinic in each village and ward. Free treatment in case of an accident.
 Employment:15 lakh government jobs and ₹3000 monthly unemployment allowance.
 Women: a monthly allowance of Rs 1,000 for women.
 Electricity: 300 units of free electricity every month.
 Financial savings: AAP distributed pamphlets during its election campaign, with a list of savings every household will potentially make if AAP comes to power in Gujarat. AAP had calculated a savings of ₹ 11.13 lakh over five years per household. The savings included ₹ 27,600 from subsidised electricity, ₹ 72,000 for annual school fees of two children of a family, ₹ 36,000 in healthcare benefits, ₹ 17,000 towards free pilgrimage for aged persons. An income of ₹ 36,000 for unemployed youth at the rate of ₹ 3,000 per month. Another income of ₹ 24,000  was shown for two adult females of each household at the rate of Rs 1,000 per month. A saving of ₹ 10,000 spent on bribes annually was also included as AAP promised a corruption-free government that will no longer require families to bribe government officials.
 Agriculture:  ₹2 Lakh worth loan waivers, higher MSP, minimum 12 hours of power supply for irrigation, compensation of Rs 20,000 per acre of land in case of crop failure, land resurvey.
 Tribals: implementation of Panchayats (Extension to Scheduled Areas) Act, 1996 (PESA) Act that gives special powers to Gram Sabhas (village councils) in the management of natural resources, formation of a Tribal Advisory Council (TAC) headed by a tribal leader, residential schools for tribal children to teach tribal history, language, culture, and traditions and also to carry out research on these topics.
 Villages:
 Village heads to be provided a fixed salary of ₹10,000
 Development grant of ₹10 lakh to each village every year to develop infrastructure and civic amenities in the villages
 Village Computer Entrepreneurs (VCEs) who work on commission basis to get a salary of ₹20,000
 Traders: involvement of the trading community in the government's decision-making process and an end of the 'raid raj' (raid regime).
 ₹1 crore compensation for policemen killed in the line of duty.
 Raising salaries of public transport staff.
 Implementation of the Old Pension Scheme.

Bharatiya Janata Party 
On 20 September, while flagging off e-bikes for Namo Kisan Panchayat programme in Gujarat, BJP National President J. P. Nadda listed out the welfare schemes for farmers rolled out by the Central government schemes.

12 Union ministers, including Smriti Irani, Kiren Rijiju, Giriraj Singh, and others, will start their poll campaign in Gujarat.

Prime Minister Narendra Modi held roadshows in Surat and Bhavnagar on 29 September 2022.

Gujarat CM Bhupendra Patel along with Modi held a rally in Rajkot on 19 October 2022.

Manifesto

 
 $1 trillion Economy and FDI: We will make Gujarat a $1 trillion economy by maintaining its pole position in manufacturing, focusing on services and investing in human and institutional capacity-building for new-age industries. We will attract ₹5 lakh crore foreign investment and make Gujarat the Defence and Aviation Manufacturing Hub of India.

 Urban Infrastructure Beautification: We will spend ₹25,000 crore under the Gujarat Urban Development Mission to transform the urban landscape with a focus on decongesting the existing cities (Satellite Townships) and increasing ease of living (Riverfront, Recreational Parks, Urban Forests, Traffic Management Systems) for citizens.

 Olympics in Gujarat: We will launch Gujarat Olympics Mission and create world-class sports infrastructure with an aim to host the Olympic Games in 2036.

 Agri Infra: We will invest ₹10,000 crore under Gujarat Krishi Infrastructure Kosh to develop a holistic system of Khedut Mandis, modern APMCs, sorting and grading units, cold chains, warehouses, primary processing centres, etc.

 Irrigration Project: We will invest ₹25,000 crore to expand the existing irrigation network through projects such as Sujalam Sufalam, SAUNI, lift irrigation projects, micro irrigation, drip irrigation and other systems across Gujarat.

 Gaushala: We will ensure holistic care for livestock by strengthening Gaushalas (additional budget of ₹500 crore), setting up 1,000 additional Mobile Veterinary Units and ensuring complete vaccination and insurance.

 Sea Food Park, corridor and Fishing Infra:We will set up 2 Sea Food Parks (one each in South Gujarat and Saurashtra), build India’s first Blue Economy Industrial Corridor and strengthen fishing related infrastructure (jetties, cold supply chain and mechanisation of boats).

 Healthcare: We will double the annual cap under the Pradhan Mantri Jan Arogya Yojana (Ayushman Bharat) from ₹5 lakh to ₹10 lakh per family and ensure free-of-cost medical treatment.

 Diagnostic Scheme: We will launch the Mukhyamantri Free Diagnostic Scheme with a corpus of ₹110 crore to provide free-of-cost diagnostic services in all government health institutions and empanelled laboratories for EWS households.

 Medical Colleges: We will create a ₹10,000 crore Maharaja Shri Bhagvatsinhji Swasthya Kosh to set up 3 Civil Medicities, 2 AIIMS-grade institutions, and upgrade infrastructure at existing healthcare facilities (Hospitals, CHCs and PHCs).

 Building School of Excellence: We will convert 20,000 government schools into Schools of Excellence with a budget of ₹10,000 crore in the next 5 years.

 Upgrading School Infra: We will launch Keshavram Kashiram Shastri Higher Education Transformation Fund with a budget of ₹1,000 crore, to construct new government colleges and revamp the existing colleges and universities with state-of-the-art facilities.

 20 lakh Jobs: We will provide 20 lakh employment opportunities to the youth of Gujarat in the next 5 years.

 4 Industrial College: We will establish 4 Gujarat Institute of Technology (GIT) on the lines of IITs as Centres of Excellence in the areas of Green Energy, Semiconductors, FinTech, and Aerospace.

 PM Awas Yojna-House Allocation: We will ensure that every citizen in Gujarat has a pucca house and ensure 100% implementation of the Pradhan Mantri Awas Yojana.

 Family Card Yojana: We will launch a Family Card Yojana, which will enable every family to avail benefits of all State Government-run welfare schemes.

 Ration: We will provide 1 litre of edible oil four times a year and 1 kg subsidised chana per month at subsidised rates through the PDS system.

 Ration Home Delivery: We will initiate mobile delivery of ration across all 56 Tribal Sub Plan Talukas.

 Tribals Development: We will spend ₹1 lakh crore under the Vanbandhu Kalyan Yojana 2.0 for the all-round socio-economic development of tribals.

 Religious Development: We will construct a Birsa Munda Adi Jati Samriddhi Corridor between Ambaji and Umergram to spur growth by connecting every tribal district’s headquarters with a 4-6 lane state highway, and by constructing a tribal cultural circuit to connect Pal Dadhvaav and the Statue of Unity to Shabari Dham.

 Building Medical Colleges: We will ensure state-of-the-art healthcare facilities in tribal areas by setting up 8 medical colleges, and 10 nursing/para-medical colleges.

 Set-up 8 GIDCs: We will set up 8 GIDCs in the tribal belt to generate employment opportunities for tribal youth.

 Edication: We will set up 25 Birsa Munda Gyan Shakti Residential Schools to provide the best residential schooling facilities to 75,000 meritorious students from the tribal community.

 Free Education: We will provide free-of-cost, quality education to all female students from KG to PG.

 Free E-scooters to Female: We will start Sharda Mehta Yojana to provide free two-wheelers (electric scooters) to meritorious college-going female students from financially weak households.

 Free Bus to Female: We will provide free bus travel to female senior citizens in the state.

 1 lakh Government Jobs: We will create more than 1 lakh government jobs for women in the next 5 years.

 Shramik Credit Cards: We will introduce Shramik Credit Cards for labourers to provide them with collateral-free loans up to ₹2 lakh.

 ₹50000 to ranker: We will provide a one-time incentive grant of ₹50,000 for OBC/ST/SC/EWS students who get into a NIRF top-ranking institution in India or a top-ranking world institution for higher education.

 Uniform Civil Code: We will ensure the complete implementation of the Gujarat Uniform Civil Code Committee’s recommendation.

 Anti-Radicalisation Cell: We will create an Anti-Radicalisation Cell to identify and eliminate potential threats, and sleeper cells of the terrorist organisations and anti-India forces.

 Pubilc-Privat Damage Recovery Act: We will enact the Gujarat Recovery of Damages of Public and Private Properties Act to recover damages done to public and private properties by anti-social elements during riots, violent protests, unrest, etc.

 Police Modernization: We will spend over ₹1,000 crore on Police Force modernisation to strengthen the physical infrastructure, purchasing best-in-class weapons and equipment, and building India’s most robust IT infrastructure.

 Highways: We will develop the first-of-its-kind Parikrama Path of 3,000 km encircling the whole state with 4-6 lane roads/ highways by constructing a South Eastern Peripheral Highway and North Western Peripheral Highway.

 Corridors: We will develop Gujarat Link Corridors by completing the missing links and augmenting the existing highways through the East-West Corridor connecting Dahod with Porbandar and North-South Corridor connecting Palanpur to Valsad.

 Exressway: We will develop a Saurashtra Express Highway Grid to provide seamless connectivity between important economic hubs and national highways.

 Metro: We will ensure time-bound completion of Gandhinagar and Surat Metro, and kick-start work on Saurashtra (Rajkot) and Central Gujarat’s (Vadodara) first metro rail service.

 Dharmic Infrastructure: We will build a Devbhumi Dwarka Corridor to establish it as western India’s biggest spiritual centre, comprising of the "World’s tallest Shree Krishna statue", a 3D immersive Bhagwat Gita experience zone and a viewing gallery for the lost city of Dwarka.

 Renovate Temples: We will invest ₹1,000 crore to renovate, expand and promote temples, following the successful transformation model of Somnath, Ambaji and Pavagadh.

 Cultural: We will invest ₹2,500 crore to promote Gujarat’s culture at the national and international levels by building museums, centres for performing arts, Sardar Patel Bhawan, etc.

Indian National Congress 
Former Congress president Rahul Gandhi launched the party's campaign in Gujarat on 5 September 2022. On the same day, he visited the Ahmedabad and attended the "Parivartan Sankalp Sammelan" where he criticized the BJP government and  promised free electricity, farm loan waiver up to ₹3 lakh, 10 lakh jobs, compensation to families affected by COVID-19 pandemic, LPG cylinder for ₹500, free education for girls, 3,000 new English medium schools and subsidy to dairy farmers.

The Congress led a state-wide "bandh" on September 10 in Gujarat as a protest against price rise and unemployment. They led demonstrations in Bharuch and other parts of Gujarat as well regarding price rise and unemployment.

On 22 September, the Congress launched the "Yuva Parivartan Yatra" (Youth for Change March) in Gujarat from Ambaji, which passed through several towns and cities across 27 districts of state. It was held in two stages from Ambaji to Umargam and Somanth to Suigam. The yatra travelled more than 2100 kilometres across the state. The Congress distributed door-to-door "Vachan Patras" or promise letters throughout the yatra, which contain 8 promises of the Congress and 4-point failures of the BJP government. It aims to deliver about 1.55 crore (15.5 million) of such promise letters before the elections. The first stage of the yatra moved throughout the tribal belt, where it focused especially on the tribal youth. The second stage of the yatra went through the Saurashtra-Kutch region.

On 28 September, the Congress held a day-long yatra in Saurashtra, starting from Rajkot and concluding at Sidsar, Junagadh. The yatra was received by Patidar leader Naresh Patel at Ma Khodiyar Temple, who welcomed the rally with 500 vehicles at the temple in Rajkot.

In recent months, many protests have been held in Gujarat, in which Congress backed the protesters.

On 31 October. the Congress started the Parivartan Sankalp Yatra in Gujarat, which covered 5 zones of the state, each lead by senior leaders of the party, namely Ashok Gehlot, Bhupesh Baghel, Digvijay Singh, Kamal Nath, and Mukul Wasnik. These programs covered 175 out of the 182 assembly seats in Gujarat. The yatra included 145 public meetings and 95 rallies, with an aim to establish "direct contact" with 45 million (4.5 crore) people. More than 1 million (10 lakh) party workers were expected to join the yatra. It covered more than 5,400 kilometres over a week.

On 6 November, the Congress released a 22 point "charge sheet" against the BJP-led state government of Gujarat. The last three decades of Gujarat have been marred by "continuous anti-people governance and mismanagement," the Congress said in the 'charge sheet'. Some highlighted points in the chargesheet were the recent Morbi bridge collapse, the release of the 11 convicted in the Bilkis Bano rape case. It also claimed that GDP rose 18-23% annually under the previous governments of the Congress, whereas the state recorded a GDP decline of 1.35% in 2020-21 under the BJP government.

On 21 November, Rahul Gandhi addressed 2 rallies in Gujarat, in Surat and in Rajkot. In his speeches at the rallies he criticized the handling of the Morbi bridge collapse and claimed that the Gujarat government was trying to take away tribals' rights.

Manifesto 
  Employment: The Congress promised to create additional 5 lakh jobs in two years. 10 lakh jobs by 2024 with 5 lakh jobs reserved for women. Abolition of contract system in government jobs and unemployment allowance of Rs 3000 for youth within a year of government formation. It also promised 10 lakh jobs for youth and the implementation of the Indira Gandhi Urban Employment Scheme, which will give work and economic support to poor families residing in the cities for at least 100 days per year, as it did in Rajasthan. Congress also promised to regularise 15 lakh contractual and outsourced employees' jobs.
Healthcare: In August, Congress released its healthcare manifesto named Jan Arogya Sankalp Patra. It promised free treatment up to Rs 10 lakh and free organ transplants if voted to power. It also said it would increase the healthcare budget of the state, and also create a special law to reduce gender imbalance. Places with gender imbalances would be identified and Rs 3000 per month would be given to the bank accounts of daughters, and assistance of Rs 30 lakh to those who have only daughters in old age. It promised Rs 4 lakh assistance to over 3 lakh families of Covid victims. Among its other promises included Renovation of PHC and CHC hospitals across the state with modern and adequate facilities and recruition of specialist doctors, paramedical staff at all levels to strengthen the health service of the state. Setup of a 'tricolour clinic' (Tiranga Clinic) in urban areas to provide "service, diagnosis, treatment" at the ward level. After Aam Aadmi Party announced Mohalla clinics for Gujarat along the lines of those it built in Delhi, Congress copied the promise and announced to open 'Janata Dawakhana' (Public pharmacy).
 Education: Mahatma Gandhi Model School at every taluka along with a "Mahatma Gandhi Education Complex" from primary to higher education,  3,000 English-medium schools, and free education to girls from KG to PG.
 Corruption:  stricter anti-corruption laws and scrutiny of corruption of the last 27 years, along with jail term to the guilty.
 Agriculture: farm loan waiver up to 3 lakh, waive agriculture-related electricity bill,. subsidy of Rs 5 per litre to milk producers, pressure on the central government to abolish GST on farm implements, fertilizers, seeds, and pesticides. Land resurvey.
 Price Rise: free electricity for every household up to 300 units and also to cap the price of a gas cylinder at Rs 500.
 Senior Citizens: restoration of the Old Pension Scheme in Gujarat.
 Compensation: Increased compensation for next kin of soldiers and police officer's killed in the line of duty.

Incidents

Aam Aadmi Party 

After Surat AAP Pradesh Pramukh Sorathiya was attacked on August 31, Italia posted a video message in which he allegedly made defamatory remarks, in which Aam Aadmi Party Gujarat President Gopal Italia called Minister of State for Home Harsh Sanghavi Drugs Sanghvi while BJP state president C. R. Patil was called ex bootlegger, following which an FIR was also registered against Gopal Italia at Umra police station.

Kejriwal accused Prime Minister Narendra Modi and the BJP of trying to "crush" the AAP in the name of fighting corruption as they feared of getting defeated in the election. He said that the Modi government was trying to implicate AAP leaders in false corruption cases as the BJP is "not able to digest the growing popularity of the AAP in Gujarat". He accused that the AAP's growing influence in Gujarat has rattled BJP and that "the prime minister's advisor Hiren Joshi has warned several TV channels owners and their editors not to give coverage to AAP party in Gujarat, threatening them with dire consequences".

On 11 September 2022, AAP alleged that the Ahmedabad Police raided its data management center in Ahmedabad, which was denied by the local police. AAP said the ruling party was "extremely rattled" by the "immense support" received by AAP in Gujarat.

AAP national joint secretary Isudan Gadhvi alleged that the BJP had been preventing AAP spokesperson from debate by threatening TV Media. He alleged that in order to prevent a rally by Kejriwal in Vadodara, BJP threatened the owners of 13 venues and forced them to cancel programmes. Kejriwal said that stopping the opposition parties from holding election programmes was wrong for the ruling party BJP.

AAP's candidate for Bardoli, Rajendra Solanki gave a statement to the Surat Rural Police, admitting that he received Rs 20 lakh in hawala after the said money was found in his car. The statement eventually led to the Gujarat Police busting a poll-related hawala racket in which 30 people outside the state were being hired by the AAP for distributing hawala money during the assembly elections. An income tax probe revealed that the AAP sent Rs 20 crore in hawala money to Gujarat for poll-related uses in the month of October 2022. According to income tax officials, as much as Rs 50 lakh of hawala money was sent daily.

Bharatiya Janata Party 
The BJP-led Gujarat government has proposed to form a committee to explore implementation of a Uniform Civil Code ahead of elections, which was met with criticism from other parties.

The famous cricketer and husband of Rivaba Jadeja, BJP candidate from Jamnagar North, Ravindra Jadeja's father and sister Anirudhsinh Jadeja and Naynaba Jadeja were seen campaigning for Congress in Gujarat.

Indian National Congress 
On 21 September 2022, 15 Congress MLAs including Jignesh Mevani were suspended from the Gujarat Assembly for a day following chaos with Leader of Opposition Sukhram Rathva, a Congress leader, demanding a special half-hour on various issues, mainly about agitating government employees, farmers, anganwadi workers and ex-servicemen. When assembly speaker Nimaben Acharya refused Rathva's demand, Congress MLAs shouted slogans and raised placards against the BJP government. The following day another 10 Congress MLAs were suspended for a day (from the assembly) over chaos, as they shouted slogans demanding a discussion on the OBC reservation, after speaker Acharya again declined a discussion. Many MLAs raised slogans and placards such as raised "Give OBCs, 27 per cent reservation" and "We demand caste-based census".

Others

On 21 August 2022, former state chief minister Shankersinh Vaghela launched a new party, Praja Shakti Democratic Party, with an intention to contest  election. Later he backed the INC instead.

Surveys and polls

Opinion polls

Exit polls 
Exit polls were released after 6:30 IST on 5 December, in accordance with the end of polling in the state.

Voter turnout

Results

Results by alliance and party 
Source:

Results by polling phase

Results by district

Results by constituency  
Sources:

See also 

 Elections in Gujarat
 Politics of Gujarat
 2022 elections in India
 2022 Himachal Pradesh Legislative Assembly election

References

Gujarat
State Assembly elections in Gujarat